Freaky Flyers is an air racing video game developed internally by Midway San Diego for the Xbox and PlayStation 2, while the version for the GameCube was developed by Point of View, Inc. and published by Midway Games.

Gaming modes
Freaky Flyers adventure mode follows multiple character histories. Each character has a story that develops as the player completes various challenges and missions.
Racing Mode can be played by either one or two players. As the game has been designed for comic effect, many of the tracks contain impossible missions and unorthodox challenges.
Dog Fight mode is duelling. This mode is only available in two-player mode. The players attempt to shoot each other out of the sky.

Mini-games are also included in the game. These involve various challenges, such as shooting “amigos” in the desert or rescuing non-playable characters.

Development
Freaky Flyers had a protracted development cycle. It was initially to be published by SCi Games, who demonstrated it at the 1997 European Computer Trade Show. It was originally released only for the Xbox and PlayStation 2, before a two-disc GameCube port was issued shortly afterwards.

Reception

The game received “mixed or average reviews” on all platforms according to the review aggregation website Metacritic. Areas that were praised include the large cast of characters and over 90 minutes of pre-rendered cutscenes included in the game. However, the game was criticized for its slow racing speeds and repetitive character lines and music. 

Jeff Gerstmann of GameSpot noted that “The game does have its moments, but the racing simply isn’t very exciting.”

References

External links

 

2003 video games
Air racing video games
Combat flight simulators
GameCube games
Midway video games
PlayStation 2 games
Video games developed in the United States
Xbox games